Steven Edwards (born  February 20, 1979) is a former American football guard. He was signed by the Philadelphia Eagles as an undrafted free agent in 2002. He played college football at UCF.

Edwards was also a member of the Chicago Bears, New York Giants, Baltimore Ravens and California Redwoods.

Early years
Edwards was born and raised on the southside of Chicago in the Beverly neighborhood. Edwards played grade school ball at St. Barnabas Elementary, went on to play high school football at Mount Carmel High School (Chicago), and was starting tackle on the undefeated 1996 Illinois State Champions team. That team ranked number three in the nation according to USA Today.

Philadelphia Eagles

Edwards signed with the Eagles as an undrafted rookie free agent in the 2002 NFL Draft. Edwards would go on to make the practice squad with
the Eagles. Edwards spent several weeks on the Eagles practice squad before signing on to the Chicago Bears active roster.

Chicago Bears 

The Chicago Bears signed Edwards to their active roster from the Eagles practice several weeks into the 2002 season. In 2003 Edwards would start all 16 games and play every snap for the Bears. In 2004 Edwards started 8 games and played 14 games for the Bears. In 2005 Edwards served mostly as a backup for the Bears. During Edward's four years with the Bears he was known for his versatility, playing every position on the offensive line except for center.

Baltimore Ravens
Edwards was signed as a free agent by the Baltimore Ravens on June 11, 2007. He was placed on injured reserve and then waived with an injury settlement on August 27, 2007.

California Redwoods
Edwards was signed by the California Redwoods of the United Football League on September 2, 2009.

References

External links
Just Sports Stats
United Football League bio

1979 births
Living people
Players of American football from Chicago
American football offensive tackles
UCF Knights football players
West Hills Falcons football players
Tennessee State Tigers football players
Philadelphia Eagles players
Chicago Bears players
New York Giants players
Baltimore Ravens players
Sacramento Mountain Lions players
Philadelphia Soul players
Arizona Rattlers players
Chicago Rush players
Orlando Predators coaches